The Hueang River is one of the boundary rivers between Thailand and Laos. It originates in the hills of Na Haeo district, Loei Province. Outing there, it flows through Dan Sai, Phu Ruea, Tha Li districts and mouths to the Mekong River in Chiang Khan district, Loei Province.

Rivers of Thailand
Rivers of Laos
International rivers of Asia
Laos–Thailand border
Tributaries of the Mekong River